Afghanistan participated in the 2011 Asian Winter Games in Almaty and Astana, Kazakhstan from January 30, 2011, to February 6, 2011.

Cross-country skiing

Afghanistan's only athlete competed in one race finishing in seventh (and last) place.

Men

References

Nations at the 2011 Asian Winter Games
Asian Winter Games
Afghanistan at the Asian Winter Games